Journey is an American rock band from San Francisco, California. Formed in February 1973 as the Golden Gate Rhythm Section, the group was renamed Journey in the summer and originally included keyboardist and vocalist Gregg Rolie, lead guitarist Neal Schon, rhythm guitarist George Tickner, bassist Ross Valory and drummer Prairie Prince. The band's current lineup features Schon, alongside keyboardist and rhythm guitarist Jonathan Cain (1980–present), drummer and vocalist Deen Castronovo (1998–2015, 2021–present), vocalist Arnel Pineda (2007–present), keyboardist and vocalist Jason Derlatka (2019–present), and bassist Todd Jensen (2021–present).

History

1973–1987
Journey was formed in February 1973 by lead guitarist Neal Schon with bassist Ross Valory, rhythm guitarist George Tickner and drummer Prairie Prince, who were joined by keyboardist and vocalist Gregg Rolie in the summer before debuting live on New Year's Eve 1973. Early the next year, Prince left to rejoin his previous group the Tubes, with former John Mayall & the Bluesbreakers and Frank Zappa drummer Aynsley Dunbar taking his place on February 1, 1974. Shortly after the release of the band's self-titled debut album in 1975, Tickner left Journey to pursue a career in medicine. The guitarist was not replaced and the band remained a four-piece for its next two albums, Look into the Future and Next.

In June 1977, Journey added Robert Fleischman as its first non-instrumental lead vocalist. After just a few months, however, Fleischman was replaced by Steve Perry in October, at the end of a tour supporting Emerson, Lake & Palmer. The band issued Perry's debut album Infinity the following year, before Dunbar was dismissed in October 1978. He was replaced by Steve Smith, previously of Ronnie Montrose's band, who opened for Journey on the Infinity tour. The group's new lineup remained stable for two years and three studio albums: Evolution, Departure and the soundtrack Dream, After Dream. By the end of 1980, however, founding keyboardist Rolie had decided to leave the band, with Jonathan Cain of The Babys chosen as his replacement. Cain also served as Journey's first rhythm guitarist since Tickner's departure in 1975.

During early production for the band's ninth studio album Raised on Radio in late 1985, both Valory and Smith left Journey – the former during the second week of recording and Smith after a couple of months. Perry initially claimed that the pair left of their own accord, however they later responded in an interview that the frontman had forced them out. In later reports, Smith recalled that the band's changing approach to writing and recording had alienated him and Valory, which led to their departures. Smith performed drums on three tracks with session bassist Bob Glaub, before the two were replaced for the rest of the album by Larrie Londin and Randy Jackson, respectively. For the subsequent touring cycle, Jackson remained on bass and Mike Baird took over on drums, the latter taking over from Atma Anur.

Partway through the Raised on Radio Tour in February 1987, Perry left Journey. The singer cited worsening relations with Schon, as well as the illness and eventual death of his mother during the album's recording, as reasons for his departure. The following month, the remaining trio of Schon, Cain and Jackson performed a short instrumental set with drummer Narada Michael Walden at the Bay Area Music Awards, as well as a song with Michael Bolton (on whose upcoming solo album Cain had performed). Following the awards show performance, Journey went on hiatus and Schon and Cain went on to form Bad English.

Since 1991
On November 3, 1991, Steve Perry, Neal Schon and Jonathan Cain reunited for a one-off performance at a benefit concert for promoter Bill Graham, who had died a week earlier. Four years later, the "classic" lineup of Journey – including Perry, Schon and Cain, plus bassist Ross Valory and drummer Steve Smith – reformed, beginning rehearsals in October 1995 before starting recording for a new album early the next year. After the release of the album, Trial by Fire, Journey planned to tour before Perry suffered an injury in a hiking accident; he refused to undergo surgery, which ultimately led to his dismissal from the group.

Perry's departure was officially announced in May 1998. He was replaced immediately by Steve Augeri, formerly of Tall Stories. At the same time, Smith was also replaced by Deen Castronovo, with whom Schon and Cain had previously performed in Bad English. With the new members, Journey issued Arrival in 2001 and Generations in 2005. Shortly after the start of a tour supporting Def Leppard in June 2006, Augeri was forced to leave temporarily due to an "acute throat condition", with Talisman and former Yngwie Malmsteen vocalist Jeff Scott Soto taking his place. In December, the replacement was made permanent.

Within six months of his permanent appointment, Soto had left Journey as the group went on a brief hiatus. Speaking about the singer's sudden departure, Cain commented that the band "just wanted to move in a different direction sonically". Before the end of the year, the group announced Filipino vocalist Arnel Pineda as its new frontman. Revelation and Eclipse followed in 2008 and 2011. On June 14, 2015, Castronovo was arrested for assault following a domestic dispute. He was later charged with rape, sexual abuse, coercion and unlawful use of a weapon. On August 10, Castronovo was officially fired from Journey. Schon initially contacted former bandmate Smith to take his place, but as he was unavailable it was taken by Omar Hakim.

In November 2015, with his touring commitments fulfilled, Smith rejoined Journey for a third tenure. On March 3, 2020, Schon and Cain filed a lawsuit accusing Smith and bassist Valory of attempting a "corporate coup d'état" to take control of the band's business entity Nightmare Productions, and declared that the two were fired; Smith and Valory have filed a countersuit. Two months later, the group announced the return of former bassist Randy Jackson and one-time drummer Narada Michael Walden, as well as second keyboardist Jason Derlatka.

The band performed what was billed as "a special collection of notable and celebrated hits" in Times Square on New Years Eve 2022, December 31, 2021. The performance was televised on Dick Clark's New Year's Rockin' Eve, and consisted of the first verse and chorus of "Any Way You Want It" seguing into the entirety of "Don't Stop Believin'." Three band members were missing for health reasons.  Bassist Randy Jackson was replaced by Marco Mendoza and long-time drum technician Steve Toomey filled in for both Narada Michael Walden and Deen Castronovo (who had a positive COVID test shortly before the show.)

Members

Current

Former

Backup

Timeline

Lineups

References

Notes

Citations

External links
Journey official website

Journey